Giuseppe Candido (1591 – 9 December 1644) was a Roman Catholic prelate who served as Bishop of Lipari (1627–1644).

Biography
Giuseppe Candido was born in Syracuse, Italy in 1591 and ordained a priest in August 1627.
On 29 November 1627, he was appointed during the papacy of Pope Urban VIII as Bishop of Lipari.
On 2 January 1628, he was consecrated bishop by Federico Baldissera Bartolomeo Cornaro, Bishop of Vicenza, with Pietro Francesco Montorio, Bishop Emeritus of Nicastro, and Antonio Ricciulli, Bishop of Belcastro, serving as co-consecrators. 
He served as Bishop of Lipari until his death on 9 December 1644.

References

External links and additional sources
 (for Chronology of Bishops) 
 (for Chronology of Bishops) 

17th-century Roman Catholic bishops in Sicily
Bishops appointed by Pope Urban VIII
1591 births
1644 deaths